John Joseph McDonough (August 3, 1849 – November 26, 1926) was a politician and businessman from Georgia, United States.

Background
McDonough was born in 1849 in Augusta, Georgia, the son of an Irish-born immigrant.  He received his education in Atlanta's public schools and graduated from the St. Francis Xavier College in New York City.  He followed his father's footsteps and made career in the lumber industry, as well as in machinery and foundry.

Political career
McDonough was a Member of the Georgia House of Representatives in 1882 and 1883.

He was elected to a two-year term as Alderman on the City Council in 1889.  He was elected Mayor of Savannah in 1891 over incumbent John Schwarz and won re-election in 1893.

He did not run for re-election in 1895.  He ran for Mayor in 1899 but lost against Herman Myers.

Footnotes

External links
Mayor's official site

1849 births
1926 deaths
Mayors of Savannah, Georgia
American people of Irish descent